Tazewell Ellett (January 1, 1856 – May 19, 1914) was a one-term U.S. Representative from Virginia from 1895 to 1897.

Biography
Born in Richmond, Virginia in 1856, Ellett attended private schools in Richmond.
He graduated from the Virginia Military Institute at Lexington in 1876.
He was graduated from the University of Virginia Law School in 1878 and immediately commenced practice in Richmond.
He later served as member of the board of visitors of the Virginia Military Institute.

In 1894, Ellett was elected as a Democrat to the Fifty-fourth Congress (March 4, 1895 – March 3, 1897) with 63.31% of the vote, defeating Republican J.W. Southward, Independents James M. Gregory, and Martin M. Lipscomb, and Progressive G.M. Smithdeal.
He was an unsuccessful candidate for reelection in 1896 to the Fifty-fifth Congress.

After Congress, he resumed the practice of law in Richmond, and New York City.

He died in Summerville, South Carolina, May 19, 1914.
He was interred in Hollywood Cemetery, Richmond, Virginia.

Sources

1856 births
1914 deaths
Virginia lawyers
Virginia Military Institute alumni
Burials at Hollywood Cemetery (Richmond, Virginia)
People from Summerville, South Carolina
Democratic Party members of the United States House of Representatives from Virginia
University of Virginia School of Law alumni
19th-century American politicians
19th-century American lawyers